Cerro Bravo Alto is a mountain in the Andes Mountains of Chile.

See also
List of mountains in the Andes

Bravo Alto